KRLB-LD channel 29.1 is a low-powered religious television station in Richland, Washington, owned by Radiant Light Broadcasting, and affiliated with the Trinity Broadcasting Network.

KRLB-LD programming can also be seen on KWWO-LP channel 32.1 Walla Walla, Washington. However, for continuity reasons, the signal is masked as channel 29.1. KRLB is seen on channel 7 on Charter Communications in the Mid-Columbia Basin.

Prior to the digital transition, KRLB-LP was broadcast on analog channel 49. As of March 17, 2009, KRLB-LP broadcasts only in digital.

These stations are not related to WRLM in Canton, Ohio, whose licensee name is the similar "Radiant Light Ministries".

History
The Call Letters KRLB, previously belonged to 99.5 FM Lubbock, Texas, now known as KQBR-FM. Before it went to the FM band, it was KRLB-AM 580. Station started out as a daytime directional KDAV-AM, Lubbock, Texas at its inception.

External links
 Radiant Light Broadcasting
 
 

RLB-LD
Television channels and stations established in 1984
Low-power television stations in the United States